Trial in absentia is a criminal proceeding in a court of law in which the person who is subject to it is not physically present at those proceedings.  is Latin for "in (the) absence". Its meaning varies by jurisdiction and legal system.

In common law legal systems, the phrase is more than a spatial description. In these systems, it suggests a recognition of a violation of a defendant's right to be present in court proceedings in a criminal trial. Conviction in a trial in which a defendant is not present to answer the charges is held to be a violation of natural justice. Specifically, it violates the second principle of natural justice,  (hear the other party).

In some civil law legal systems, such as that of Italy,  is a recognized and accepted defensive strategy. Such trials may require the presence of the defendant's lawyer, depending on the country.

Europe 

Member states of the Council of Europe that are party to the European Convention on Human Rights are bound to adhere to Article 6 of the convention, which protects the right to a fair trial.

Trials in absentia are banned in some member states of the EU and permitted in others, posing significant problems for the fluidity of mutual recognition of these judicial judgments. The executing member state possesses some degree of discretion and is not obliged to execute a European Arrest Warrant if the country that is making the request has already tried that person in absentia.

Conditions under which trials in absentia must be recognised include: if the person can be said to have been aware of the trial; if a counsellor took their place at the trial; if they do not request an appeal in due time; and if they are to be offered an appeal.

The framework decision on the European Arrest Warrant provides for the legal guarantees relevant to trials in absentia. While the framework decision explicitly refers to Article 6 of the European Convention on Human Rights, its purpose is not to harmonise national laws on trials in absentia but to provide terms for the non-recognition of a European Arrest Warrant and other cooperative tools. The framework decision provides detailed conditions and requirements on which a trial in absentia can be considered compatible with Article 6, the right to a fair trial.

According to Pieter Cleppe of the think-tank Open Europe, in parts of Europe, in absentia trials essentially give defendants the ability to appeal twice—asking for a retrial at which they would be present and then potentially appealing the second verdict.

The Council of Europe has made commentary on judgments that are made in absentia. The Committee of Ministers, in Resolution (75) 11, of 21 May 1975, stated that an individual must first be effectively served with a summons prior to being tried.  In this sense, the ministers are emphasizing that it is not the presence of the accused at the hearing that is of importance, rather the focus should be on whether or not the individual was informed of the trial in time.

In a 1985 judgement in the case Colozza v Italy, the European Court of Human Rights stressed that a person charged with a criminal offence is entitled to take part in the hearings. This entitlement is based on the right to a fair trial and the right to a defence, both of which are required by the convention (articles 6(1) and 6(3)). Furthermore, the court stressed that a person convicted in absentia shall be entitled to a fresh trial once he becomes aware of the proceedings:

Belgium 
The Human Rights Committee (HRC) examined Monguya Mbenge v. Zaire (1990) in which the applicant was sentenced to death while exiled in Belgium and was only able to learn of the case against him through the media. Due to these circumstances, the committee found that a number of the applicant's procedural rights had been violated, especially in consideration of the fact that the Zairean authorities had hardly attempted to contact the applicant despite possible knowledge of the applicant's address. This highly impeded the applicant's capacity to prepare any form of defense. Failed evidence to support the case that a court had tried to inform the accused of proceedings against him/her provides the committee with the opinion that the right to be tried in one's presence was violated.

Czech Republic 
Under Article 8(2) of the Charter of Fundamental Rights and Basic Freedoms of the Czech Republic, which has the same legal standing as the Czech Constitution, no one may be prosecuted or deprived of their liberty except on grounds and in a manner specified by law.

In general, the Czech Criminal Procedural Code requires the presence of the defendant in any criminal proceedings. The code recognizes the following exemptions from this rule, when criminal proceedings may be conducted without the presence of the person charged:
 Where a defendant has died (involving the continuation or reopening of proceedings in order to clear a deceased defendant's name).
 Where a defendant is unknown:
 This may arise before charges against a person are brought, normally in respect of pre-trial proceedings. For example, if police conclude that a crime has been committed and that action needs to be taken to identify the perpetrator, such as the interrogation of a witness or an identity parade, such an action is taken in the presence of a judge because the rights of the (still unidentified) criminal suspect cannot otherwise be adequately protected during the evidence gathering. Normally, a defendant enjoys the right to be present or represented by an attorney during the interrogation or identity parade. But where the defendant is not yet identified, in order to secure full legality and impartiality, a judge is present. This ensures the admissibility of the resulting evidence will not be successfully challenged during the trial. Typically, this situation might involve a dying witness, not expected to be available later for cross-examination at a trial by or on behalf of the defendant.
 When confiscating property involved in criminal case from an unknown owner, the property confiscated will remain the property of the unknown owner pending a trial and a court decision to transfer the property confiscated to the state.  An example could arise where the property to be confiscated might endanger people, property or society, or might be used for commission of a felony. Typically, this concerns prohibited weapons or ammunition, explosives, narcotics, poisons, etc., seized by the police without, at the time of the seizure, knowing the owner's identity.
 Where a defendant is known:
 Where an accused person is evading proceedings by being either abroad or in hiding, the proceedings may be conducted in absentia. The proceedings are then officially started by the formal delivery of charges to the defendant's attorney. If the defendant does not have an attorney, the court will appoint one. An attorney must in these circumstances be appointed throughout the entire proceedings, and will have all the defendant's rights. All documents intended for the defendant will be delivered to the attorney and the court must take "appropriate measures" to announce the trial publicly. Where the absent defendant subsequently appears during the trial, the proceedings shall continue in the normal way. The defendant may request that any evidence that had been presented in his absence be presented again; where this is not possible, he will be shown records of it and may comment on it. Where the case has ended with an enforceable judgment, the convicted party may request a fresh trial within eight days of the delivery of the judgment to him. The fresh trial may not lead to an outcome that would be less favorable to the defendant than the outcome of the previous in absentia trial.

Apart from the aforementioned cases of in absentia proceedings in the narrow sense, the defendant may also be absent during the trial under following circumstances:

 When the defendant fails to appear for the trial: only if 
the indictment was duly delivered and 
the defendant was duly summoned for the trial (i.e. is not in hiding) and 
the defendant has already been formally questioned during pre-trial proceedings (whether or not they elected to remain silent) and
the defendant has been alerted about their right to study the case file and to put forward motions for investigation and 
the court determines that, despite the defendant's absence from the trial, the case can be reliably decided and the purposes of the trial achieved.
 When the defendant requests that the trial takes place in their absence: if the defendant is being held on remand, a simple failure to appear is not permitted: the defendant must formally request that the proceedings to take place in their absence
 When the defendant is disrupting the proceedings: trial in absentia is possible only on basis of a formal ruling of, and subject to previous warning by, the court, and only for the necessary period of time. Immediately after allowing the defendant back into the courtroom, the presiding judge must convey the essential content of the proceedings taken in the defendant's absence, so as allow them to comment on it.

Italy
Italy is one of several countries in Europe that allow trials in absentia, and they are a regular occurrence.

In Maleki v Italy (1997), the United Nations Human Rights Committee held that the Italian policy on trials in absentia was a breach of the right to fair trial under Article 14 of the International Covenant on Civil and Political Rights. Italy argued that where a defendant in absentia is represented by court-appointed counsel and where he or she has an opportunity to be re-tried, the right to a fair trial will not be violated. The committee disagreed, describing Italy's position as:

In 2009, a former CIA station chief and two other Americans were tried and convicted in absentia by a Milan appeals court for the abduction of Egyptian terror suspect Osama Hassan Mustafa Nasr. The decision meant that 26 Americans tried in absentia for the abduction were found guilty.

The trial of American Amanda Knox for the 2007 murder of British student Meredith Kercher highlighted the issue of Italy's willingness to try defendants in absentia. In 2013 Italy's highest court, the Court of Cassation, decided to annul Knox's appeal (alongside the co-accused, Italian Raffaele Sollecito), thus overturning their previous acquittals, declaring the acquittal as "full of deficiencies, contradictions and illogical conclusions".

As Amanda Knox remained at her home in the United States, her appeal was heard in absentia, in Florence, Italy. On 30 January 2014 her guilty verdict was re-instated for the murder of Kercher and her sentence set at 28 years and six months imprisonment.

In the case of Goddi v. Italy, the European Court of Human Rights held that the failure of Italy's judiciary to inform the officially appointed lawyer of the applicant in regards to the correct date of the trial hearing deprived the applicant of an effective defence, and therefore Article 6 (3) (c) had been violated.

Certain case law supports the notion that in some circumstances representation by counsel at the trial will not be enough to make an in absentia conviction conclusive enough for the establishment of probable cause. In Gallina v Fraser, the appellant Vincenzo Gallina was convicted in absentia according to established Italian procedure for two robberies. The verdict in Gallina has been since interpreted to suggest that the presence of legal counsel alone is, in certain cases, insufficient to give an in absentia conviction that establishes probable cause.

United States 
For more than 100 years, courts in the United States have held that the United States Constitution protects a criminal defendant's right to appear in person at their trial, as a matter of due process, under the Fifth, Sixth, and Fourteenth Amendments.

In 1884, the Supreme Court of the United States held that

A similar holding was announced by the Arizona Court of Appeals in 2004 (based on Arizona Rules of Criminal Procedure):

Although United States Congress codified this right by approving Rule 43 of the Federal Rules of Criminal Procedure in 1946 and amended the Rule in 1973, the right is not absolute.

Rule 43 provides that a defendant shall be present

 at the arraignment,
 at the time of the plea,
 at every stage of the trial including the impaneling of the jury and the return of the verdict and
 at the imposition of sentence.

However, the following exceptions are included in the Rule:
 the defendant waives his or her right to be present if he or she voluntarily leaves the trial after it has commenced,
 if he or she persists in disruptive conduct after being warned that such conduct will cause him or her to be removed from the courtroom,
 a corporation need not be present, but may be represented by counsel,
 in prosecutions for misdemeanors, the court may permit arraignment, plea, trial, and imposition of sentence in the defendant's absence with his or her written consent, and
 the defendant need not be present at a conference or argument upon a question of law or at a reduction of sentence under Rule 35 of the Federal Rules of Criminal Procedure.

Indeed, several U.S. Supreme Court decisions have recognized that a defendant may forfeit the right to be present at trial through disruptive behavior, or through his or her voluntary absence after trial has begun.

In 1993, the Supreme Court revisited Rule 43 in the case of Crosby v. United States. The Court unanimously held, in an opinion written by Justice Harry Blackmun, that Rule 43 does not permit the trial in absentia of a defendant who is absent at the beginning of trial.

However, in Crosby, the Rehnquist Court reiterated an 80-year-old precedent that

Examples 

Examples of people convicted in absentia are:
 Charles I of England was removed from his trial due to his disruptive behavior, and sentenced to death by beheading without being in the room. 
 Cesare Battisti, thriller author and former member of the Italian terrorist group Armed Proletarians for Communism, sentenced to life. (Arrested on March 18, 2007, in Brazil, and then released on 9 June 2011.)
Ian Bailey, a British man convicted in absentia by a French court of the murder of a French woman in Ireland.
 Adem Jashari, leader of the Kosovo Liberation Army, was convicted in July 1997 in absentia by a Yugoslav court after several unsuccessful attempts to capture or kill him.
 Krim Belkacem, Algerian Berber resistance fighter and politician. (Assassinated on October 18, 1970, in West Germany.)
 Heinrich Boere, a Dutch or German convicted by a Dutch court in 1949 of murders on the part of the World War II German occupation authorities in the Netherlands. German courts refused to extradite Boere to the Netherlands due to his possibly having German citizenship.
 Martin Bormann, Nazi official and Hitler's private secretary, convicted of war crimes and crimes against humanity and sentenced to death by hanging at the Nuremberg war crimes trials. (Disappeared on May 2, 1945, his remains were uncovered in late 1972 in West Berlin, and conclusively identified as those of Bormann in 1998.)
 Dési Bouterse, Suriname's former military leader, sentenced to 16 years in prison and fined $2.18 million in the Netherlands for cocaine trafficking.
 Ahmed Chalabi, former Iraqi oil minister, convicted in Jordan for bank fraud.
 Bettino Craxi, Italian former prime minister, sentenced in absentia to 27 years in jail in Italy, who previously fled to Hammamet in Tunisia in 1994, and remained a fugitive there, protected by Ben Ali's regime.
 Léon Degrelle, Belgian Nazi collaborator sentenced to death by firing squad while he lived in Spain.
Ryszard Kukliński, a Polish colonel, Cold War spy and communist whistleblower, sentenced in absentia to death as a traitor in 1984 by a communist court in the Polish People's Republic. He was finally acquitted in 1997. It was said his activity was in a State of Necessity.
 Ira Einhorn, murderer and anti-war activist, who challenged his conviction in Pennsylvania. (Escaped to Europe, but was extradited from France back to the US on July 20, 2001.)
 John Factor, a British-born American gangster and con man, charged with securities fraud in England and tried and sentenced to 24 years in prison in absentia after fleeing back to the United States.
 Charles de Gaulle, sentenced first to four years in prison and later to death in 1940 for treason against the Vichy regime.
 Oleg Gordievsky, sentenced to death by the Soviet Union for treason after fleeing to the United Kingdom in 1985.
 Boļeslavs Maikovskis, Latvian Nazi collaborator sentenced to death by a Soviet court in 1965 (while living in the United States).
 Mengistu Haile Mariam, former communist dictator sentenced to death in Ethiopia for genocide in May 2008.
 Jamal Jafaar Mohammed aka Abu Mahdi al-Muhandis, sentenced to death by a Kuwaiti court for the 1983 Kuwait bombings. He served in Iraq's parliament (2006–2007) as a member of Prime Minister Nouri al-Maliki's Islamic Dawa Party and was killed in the 2020 Baghdad International Airport airstrike by a United States drone.
 Abu Musab al-Zarqawi, sentenced to death in Jordan. (Killed on June 7, 2006, in Iraq.)
 Andrew Luster, convicted of rape after fleeing mid-trial.
 Filiberto Ojeda Ríos, convicted in the US after fleeing.
 Zine El Abidine Ben Ali, former president of Tunisia, sentenced to life in prison along with his wife, Leïla Ben Ali.
 Bernardo Provenzano, Sicilian Mafia boss convicted of numerous murders during his 42 years as a fugitive.
 Michael Townley, Chilean DINA agent, has been convicted in 1993 by an Italian court in carrying out the 1975 Rome murder attempt on Bernardo Leighton. (Currently living under the United States Federal Witness Protection Program.)
 Sholam Weiss, sentenced to the longest federal prison term in United States history (835 years) for fraud, money laundering and other crimes, jumped bail mid-trial. (Extradited by Austria on June 20, 2002.)
 Arkady Shevchenko, high ranking SVR official of the USSR, sentenced to death in Moscow in absentia after defecting to the United States. 
 Irakli Okruashvili, Defense Minister of Georgia from 2004 to 2006 and a personal friend of Georgian president Mikheil Saakashvili. Okruashvili returned to prominence when he formed an opposition party to the Georgian government and accused it of corruption and plotting assassinations. He was arrested days later on charges of extortion, bribe taking, and abuse of power, and released on $6 million bail pending trial. He flew to Europe, supposedly to seek medical treatment, but tried to find political asylum. He was denied asylum in Germany, but received it in France, which refused an extradition request from Georgia. He was tried in absentia, found guilty, and sentenced to 11 years imprisonment.
In 2011, Eugene Koffi Adoboli was sentenced to five years in jail in absentia stemming from an embezzlement scandal while he was Prime Minister of Togo.
 Anwar al-Awlaki, radical Islamic cleric assassinated by drone by the United States in Yemen in 2011.
 Alexander Poteyev, ex-colonel of the Russian intelligence agency SVR, was sentenced in absentia to 25 years of imprisonment on the charge of high treason by Moscow court in 2011. His whereabouts are unknown; presumably he lives in the United States under protection of the US government.
 Kent Kristensen, Danish businessman was sentenced in Romania in absentia to seven years for not paying an official in a building project. He was arrested in Spain in 2011 when he tried to save his child who was abducted by her mother. He is serving his time at the Giurgiu maximum security prison. In March 2012 it was reported that the Romania denied him his medication.
 Amanda Knox, tried in absentia and convicted in 2013 (later cleared), for the 2007 murder of Meredith Kercher.
 Dmitry Yazov, Soviet Marshal convicted in absentia by Lithuania for deadly military crackdown in 1991 and sentenced to 10 years in jail.
 Julie d'Aubigny, 17th-century French duelist charged with kidnapping, arson and body snatching in absentia.

See also 
 
 Declared death in absentia
 Default judgment (a civil counterpart)
 In absentia (disambiguation)
 List of Latin phrases

References

External links 
 

Latin legal terminology